Changshou may refer to:

 Changshou District, Chongqing, China
 Changshou, Pingjiang (长寿镇), a town in Pingjiang County, Hunan, China
 Lake Changshou, Chongqing, China